Vera Vergani (1894–1989) was an Italian stage actress. She also starred in a number of silent films. She was the mother of the film producer Leo Pescarolo.

She played the title role in the 1927 Milan stage production of Salvatore Di Giacomo's Assunta Spina at the Teatro Manzoni.

Selected filmography
 The Fear of Love (1920)
 Caterina (1921)
 The Dreamer (1965)

References

Bibliography
 Goble, Alan. The Complete Index to Literary Sources in Film. Walter de Gruyter, 1999.

External links

1894 births
1989 deaths
Italian film actresses
Italian stage actresses
Actresses from Milan